United Nations Security Council Resolution 344, adopted on December 15, 1973, on the eve of the peace conference arranged for in resolution 338, the Council expressed the hope that speedy progress would be made toward the establishment of the just and durable peace in the Middle East. The Council also expressed its confidence that the Secretary-General would play a full and effective role at the conference and requested that he keep the Council informed on the developments in negotiations.

The resolution was adopted with 10 votes to none; with 4 abstentions from France, the Soviet Union, United Kingdom and United States.

See also
 List of United Nations Security Council Resolutions 301 to 400 (1971–1976)

References 
Text of the Resolution at undocs.org

External links
 

 0344
Arab–Israeli peace process
December 1973 events